Chlorine tetroxide is an unstable chlorine oxide with the chemical formula .

History

Gomberg's mistaken 1923 production
In 1923, the famous radical chemist Moses Gomberg proposed a production method of chlorine tetroxide. He claimed that treating iodine and silver perchlorate in anhydrous diethyl ether produced it.

I2 + 2 AgClO4 → 2 AgI + (ClO4)2

However, later researchers claimed that the product was iodine perchlorate. So far, however, there is no certain evidence for the existence of iodine perchlorate either.

Eachus' 1968 production
In 1968, Eachus synthesized it by exposing potassium chlorate to gamma rays at 77 K. It is a reaction intermediate of the decomposition of dichlorine heptoxide.

Properties
The electron affinity energy of chlorine tetroxide can be figured out using the Born–Haber cycle and the lattice energy data of perchlorates. It is about 561 kJ/mol.

The structure of chlorine tetroxide is uncertain; the molecular point group may be Cs, C2v, or Td.

In a solid oxygen matrix ClO4 reacts to form ClO6Cl, which has three double bonded oxygen atoms, and a chain of three oxygen atoms -O-O-O• attached to the chlorine.

References

Chlorine oxides